Maria Antonieta Gaxiola (born 20 May 1997) is a Mexican racing cyclist. In September 2020, she won the Mexican National Road Race Championships.

References

1997 births
Living people
Mexican female cyclists
Place of birth missing (living people)
20th-century Mexican women
21st-century Mexican women